Puerto Rico Highway 20 (PR-20) or Expreso Rafael Martínez Nadal is a short tollway located entirely in the municipality of Guaynabo, Puerto Rico.

Route description
It used to be divided highway with traffic signals, which even turned into a rural road near its south end, but due to the traffic congestion in parallel freeway PR-18, and also in PR-1 and PR-52, it had to be converted and is now 9.5 kilometers long. It has few exits; the first being to PR-169, a road to the rural area of Guaynabo and part of Aguas Buenas, Puerto Rico; PR-199 which connects it to PR-1 and PR-52; PR-177 which serves Bayamón and Cupey, and PR-17 (Ave. Piñero). It begins in the Muda sector of PR-1 and ends near San Patricio in Caparra, Guaynabo, at PR-2. It is tolled going north from PR-1, but not in the other direction.

Tolls

Exit list

See also

 List of highways numbered 20
 Rafael Martínez Nadal

References

External links
 

020
20